There are thousands of historic sites and attractions in Scotland.  These include Neolithic Standing stones and Stone Circles, Bronze Age settlements, Iron Age Brochs and Crannogs, Pictish stones, Roman forts and camps, Viking settlements, Mediaeval castles, and early Christian settlements.  Scotland also played an important role in the development of the modern world, and there are many industrial heritage sites and museums. A few of the best known are listed below:

Sites and monuments

Neolithic sites
Callanish, Lewis
Corrimony, Glen Urquhart (Glenurquhart)
Croftmoraig, Perthshire
Kilmartin Glen, Argyll
Machrie Moor, Arran
Maeshowe, Orkney
Ring of Brodgar, Orkney
Skara Brae, Orkney
Standing Stones of Stenness, Orkney

Pictish stones

Roman sites
Antonine Wall, Scottish Lowlands
Trimontium, Scottish Borders

Castles

Abbeys

Cathedrals

Historic houses

Monuments
Wallace Monument, Stirling
National Monument, Edinburgh
Nelson Monument, Edinburgh
Scott Monument, Edinburgh

Historic sites and battles
Stirling Bridge, 1297
Bannockburn 1314
Killiecrankie, 1689
Glenfinnan, (Raising of Standard in 1745, see Jacobitism)
Culloden, 1746

Museums

See also
History of Scotland 
Tourism in Scotland.

External links
Historic Environment Scotland (official government agency)
The National Trust for Scotland 
National Museums of Scotland

 
Historic sites
Historic
Historic
Historic sites